The Green Revolution was a massive increase in agricultural yields between 1943 and 1970 that occurred worldwide.

Green Revolution may also refer to:

The Green Revolution in India, a massive increase in agricultural products in India
The 2009 Iranian presidential election protests, an attempted revolution after Iran's 2009 presidential election
The rise of Muammar Gaddafi's regime in Libya
Environmental Revolution, an ongoing process of mitigation of climate change and use of sustainable technologies
 Second Green Revolution, an ongoing change in agricultural production

See also

 Agronomic revolution
 Agrarian revolution (disambiguation)
 Agricultural revolution (disambiguation)
 
 Revolution (disambiguation)
 Green (disambiguation)